Anna Williams may refer to:

 Anna Williams (poet) (1706–1783), writer and friend of Samuel Johnson
 Anna Maria Williams (1839–1929), New Zealand teacher and school principal
 Anna Wessels Williams (1863–1954), pioneering female doctor and bacteriologist
 Anna Willess Williams (1857–1926), American teacher and philosophical writer best known as the model for George T. Morgan's silver dollar design
 Anna Williams (politician) (born 1980), American politician serving in the Oregon House of Representatives
 Anna-Lynne Williams (born 1978), lead singer of the band Trespassers William
 Anna Williams, one of the intended victims of serial killer Dennis Rader, "The BTK Strangler"
 Anna Williams (Tekken), fictional character for the Tekken video game series
 Anna Williams, character in The Actress
 Anna Williams (footballer), head coach of the Sierra Leone women's national football team

See also
 Ann Williams (disambiguation)